Kaatrinile Varum Geetham is a 1978 Indian Tamil-language film, directed by S. P. Muthuraman and written by Panchu Arunachalam. The film stars R. Muthuraman and Kavitha. It was released on 26 January 1978.

Plot 
Mohan loves Kamini but her father kills her after learning about their relationship. Distressed, he goes on a trip where he meets Rosy, a lookalike of his former lover, and falls for her.

Cast 
R. Muthuraman as Mohan
Kavitha as Geetha/Kamini/Rosy
Thengai Srinivasan as Chandran
Srikanth as James
S. A. Ashokan as Veerayan
M. N. Rajam as Mohan's mother
Major Sundarrajan
Sukumari
Y. G. Mahendran as flight passenger
Usilaimani as flight passenger

Soundtrack 
The music for this film was composed by Ilaiyaraaja and lyrics were written by Panchu Arunachalam. The song "Oru Vanavil Pole" is set to Yamunakalyani raga. Ilayaraja later reused "Chithirai Sevvanam" as "Chukkalu Temmanna" for the Telugu film April 1 Vidudala.

Reception 
Ananda Vikatan rated the film 45 out of 100.

References

External links 
 

1970s Tamil-language films
1978 films
Films directed by S. P. Muthuraman
Films scored by Ilaiyaraaja
Films with screenplays by Panchu Arunachalam